Bruce Wayne Hawkins (13 April 1954 – 21 October 2022) was an American linguist who studied and taught the science of cognition and self-inquiry.

He promoted a new shift in the cognitive paradigm, including an explicit study of rational, experiential truths. Hawkins earned his PhD in linguistics at the University of California in San Diego in 1984. From 1987 to 2009 he was a professor in the English Department at Illinois State University.

His most significant academic contributions appear in a pair of volumes of Language and Ideology in which he primarily edited.  Following traditional tenets of general semantics, he combined theory and practice in his classroom instruction and systematically built effectual and affective roadmaps to self-analysis.  He specifically trained undergraduates to separate highly charged linguistic environments from their higher cognitive functioning.  The overarching goal was based on developing one into a more rational, self-regulated individual.  His scientific theories are based on the established research of cognitive science and the more specific discipline of general semantics.

References

Linguists from the United States
American cognitive scientists
Living people
Illinois State University faculty
1954 births